Gridz is a video game developed and published by Green Dragon for the Macintosh.

Gameplay
Gridz is a combination of puzzle and action game set in an artificial cyber environment.

Reception
Next Generation reviewed the Macintosh version of the game, rating it three stars out of five, and stated that "Gridz is a fun, simple game, but after the sixth or seventh level, it gets a bit redundant. What elevates this game above mediocrity is an unusual clarity of purpose in graphics, control, and design."

The editors of Macworld named Gridz the best arcade game of 1997. Steven Levy and Cameron Crotty of the magazine called the game "addictive" and "maddeningly compelling".

Reviews
MacWorld
MacWorld (1.2 update)
MacHome Journal review
MacAddict

https://archive.org/details/MacAddict-016-199712/page/n69/mode/2up?q=gridz
https://archive.org/details/Macworld9801January1998/page/n81/mode/2up?q=gridz
https://archive.org/stream/macmagazin_german/Mac%20Magazin%201998-09#page/n63/mode/2up/search/gridz
http://www.insidemacgames.com/news/story.php?ArticleID=6500

References

External links
Official page (archived)

1997 video games
Classic Mac OS games
Classic Mac OS-only games
Puzzle video games